The Ministry of Home Affairs (MOHA) is a government ministry in Vietnam responsible for: organisational structure of state administration; local government organisations, management of administrative boundaries; officials, public servants and state employees; NGOs; state archives and state administration of public services.

Ministerial units
 Department of Organisation and Personnel
 Department of Local Government
 Department of Civil Servants - Public Employees
 Department of Training for Civil Servants
 Department of Remunerations
 Department of Non-governmental Organisations
 Department of Administrative Reforms
 Department of Youth Affairs
 Department of General Affairs
 Department of Planning and Finance
 Department of International Cooperation
 Department of Legislation
 Office of the Ministry
 Ministry Inspectorate
 Government Committee for Religious Affairs
 Central Committee for Emulation and Reward
 Bureau of State Records Management and Archives
 Information Centre

Administrative units
 Institute for State Organisational Sciences
 State Organisation Magazine
 Hanoi University of Home Affairs

External links
 Official site

Home Affairs
Governmental office in Hanoi
Vietnam, Home Affairs
Vietnam